Chondrosteus is a genus of extinct actinopterygian (ray-finned fish) belonging to the family Chondrosteidae. It lived during the Sinemurian (early Early Jurassic) in what is now England. Chondrosteus is remotely related to sturgeons and paddlefishes. Similar to sturgeons, the jaws of Chondrosteus were free from the rest of the skull (projectile jaw system). Its scale cover was reduced to the upper lobe of the caudal fin like in paddlefish. 

The species Chondrosteus hindenburgi from the Toarcian (late Early Jurassic) of Germany was reallocated to the genus Strongylosteus. Although some authors have suggested that the latter might be a junior synonym of Chondrosteus, there are no recent comparative studies on these two genera.

References

External links

Acipenseriformes
Prehistoric ray-finned fish genera
Fossils of Great Britain
Jurassic fish of Europe
Jurassic bony fish